The Chronicles of the Kings of Israel is a book that gives a more detailed account of the reigns of the kings of ancient Kingdom of Israel than that presented in the Hebrew Bible, and may have been the source from which parts of the biblical account were drawn. The book was likely compiled by or derived from the kings of Israel's own scribes, and is likely the source for the basic facts presented in the Bible. 

The book is referred to a number of times in the Hebrew Bible, but was either not included in the corpus of the biblical text or was removed from it at some stage. The book is counted as one of the Lost books of the Old Testament. This text is sometimes called The Book of the Chronicles of the Kings of Israel or The Book of the Annals of the Kings of Israel. 

A complementary book detailing the reigns of the kings of ancient Judah is the Chronicles of the Kings of Judah, a book which has also been lost. Another lost book dealing with the reigns of the kings of ancient Israel is the Book of the Kings of Judah and Israel. This book is referred to in 2 Chronicles and may be the same as the other two Chronicles named in Kings.

References to the Chronicles
References to the Chronicles appear in the Books of Kings and imply that the description of the reign of the kings of Israel presented in the Bible is only a brief summary, and that a fuller account is to be found in the Chronicles. 

For example,  refers to the book and reads: "And the rest of the acts of Jeroboam, how he warred, and how he reigned, behold, they are written in the book of the chronicles of the kings of Israel." 

Also,  mentions the book and reads "Now the rest of the acts of Ahaziah which he did, are they not written in the book of the chronicles of the kings of Israel?"

Again,  reads: "Now the rest of the acts of Elah, and all that he did, are they not written in the book of the chronicles of the kings of Israel?"

See also
Table of books of Judeo-Christian Scripture
Non-canonical books referenced in the Bible
Lost work
Chronicles of the Kings of Judah

References
Are There Lost Books of the Bible? Apologetics Press, December 2003, by A.P. staff 

Lost Jewish texts
Kingdom of Israel (Samaria)
Zimri (king)